Francesco Bosi (7 April 1945 – 4 July 2021) was an Italian politician who served as a Senator.

References

1945 births
2021 deaths
Italian politicians
Christian Democracy (Italy) politicians
Christian Democratic Centre politicians
Union of the Centre (2002) politicians
Mayors of places in Italy
Senators of Legislature XIII of Italy
Senators of Legislature XIV of Italy
Deputies of Legislature XV of Italy
Deputies of Legislature XVI of Italy
People from Piacenza